Justin Inglis (born 16 January 1972) is an English cricketer. He played two first-class matches for Mashonaland in 1993/94.

See also
 List of Mashonaland first-class cricketers

References

External links
 

1972 births
Living people
English cricketers
Mashonaland cricketers
Sportspeople from Solihull